Michael John Cheever (born June 24, 1973) is a former American football center in the National Football League (NFL). He played for the Jacksonville Jaguars (1996–1998). He played collegiately for the Georgia Tech football team.

Cheever was forced to retire after a serious back injury.

References

Living people
1973 births
People from Newnan, Georgia
Sportspeople from the Atlanta metropolitan area
Players of American football from Georgia (U.S. state)
American football centers
Georgia Tech Yellow Jackets football players
Jacksonville Jaguars players